Gonzalo Gutiérrez may refer to:

 Gonzalo Gutiérrez (footballer, born 1981), Uruguayan forward
 Gonzalo Gutiérrez (footballer, born 2003), Argentine midfielder